Craig Anthony Raine, FRSL (born 3 December 1944) is an English contemporary poet. Along with Christopher Reid, he is a notable pioneer of Martian poetry, a movement that expresses alienation with the world, society and objects. He was a fellow of New College, Oxford, from 1991 to 2010 and is now emeritus professor. He has been the editor of Areté since 1999. In 2020 the magazine closed after 60 issues.

Early life
Raine was born in Bishop Auckland, County Durham, the son of Norman Edward and Olive Marie Raine. His father was the North of England amateur boxing champion in 1937. He then worked as a bomb armourer for the RAF, until forced to retire due to epilepsy caused by a skull fracture. After the RAF his father worked as a pub landlord. He was raised in a prefab in Shildon, a town near Bishop Auckland. He won a scholarship to Barnard Castle School, where he lived as a boarder. Of his time there he has recalled that it seemed that everyone else's parents seemed to be: accountants or surgeons or something. I couldn't say my father was an ex-boxer who did faith healing, had epileptic fits and lived off a pension. So for a while I said he was a football manager. But by the end I was inviting my friends home and they thought he was just as terrific as I did.

Raine has commented on his education: "At Barnard Castle I was taught by an absolutely remarkable English teacher, Arnold Snodgrass, a friend of W. H. Auden at Oxford [and later Robert Graves]. There was no question that he altered my mindset on things and made me very critical." At school he wrote "'pimply Dylan Thomas' poems, some of which he sent to Philip Toynbee, then lead reviewer at The Observer".

Raine received his university education at Exeter College, University of Oxford, where he received a BA in English and later received his B.Phil.

Career
He taught at Oxford and followed a literary career as book editor for New Review, editor of Quarto, and poetry editor at the New Statesman. He became poetry editor at publishers Faber and Faber in 1981, and has been a fellow of New College, Oxford, since 1991, retiring from his post as tutor in June 2010.

In 1972 he married Ann Pasternak Slater, a now retired fellow of St Anne's College, Oxford. They have one daughter and three sons. Moses Raine is a playwright and Nina Raine a director and playwright.

Craig Raine is founder and editor of the literary magazine Areté and a frequent contributor. His works include a number of poetry collections: The Onion, Memory (1978), A Martian Sends a Postcard Home (1979), A Free Translation (1981), Rich (1984), History: The Home Movie (1994), and Clay. Whereabouts Unknown (1996). His reviews and essays are collected in two anthologies: Haydn and the Valve Trumpet (1990) and In Defence of T. S. Eliot (2000). A short critical-biographical study of Eliot, T. S. Eliot: Image, Text and Context, was published in 2007.

His friend Ian McEwan argues that Raine espouses "very strong and clear, almost Arnoldian, ideas of literature and criticism".

Books

Poetry collections
 The Onion, Memory, Oxford University Press, 1978. .
 A Journey to Greece, Sycamore Press, 1979
 A Martian Sends a Postcard Home, Oxford University Press, 1979. .
 A Free Translation, Salamander, 1981
 Rich, Faber and Faber, 1984
 The Prophetic Book (bilingual edition with Polish translation by Jerzy Jarniewicz), Correspondance des Arts, 1989 
 History: The Home Movie, Penguin, 1994
 Change, Prospero Poets, 1995
 Clay: Whereabouts Unknown, Penguin, 1996
 Collected Poems 1978–1999, Picador, 1999
 A la recherche du temps perdu, Picador, 2000
 How Snow Falls, 2010

Fiction
 Heartbreak, Atlantic, 2010
 The Divine Comedy, Atlantic, 2012

Drama
 1953: A Version of Racine's Andromaque, Faber and Faber, 1990

Libretto
 The Electrification of the Soviet Union, Faber and Faber, 1986, opera by Nigel Osborne

Criticism
 Haydn and the Valve Trumpet, Faber and Faber, 1990
 In Defence of T. S. Eliot, Picador, 2000
 T. S. Eliot: Image, Text and Context, Oxford University Press, 2007
 More Dynamite: Essays 1990–2012, Atlantic, 2013
 My Grandmother's Glass Eye: A Look at Poetry, Atlantic, 2016

As editor
 A Choice of Kipling's Prose, Faber and Faber, 1987
 Rudyard Kipling: Selected Poems, Penguin, 1992
 New Writing 7, (co-editor) Vintage, 1998

References

External links

 British Council profile
 Portraits at the National Portrait Gallery 
 "Bad Language: Poetry, Swearing and Translation" article by Craig Raine in Thumbscrew magazine, No 1 – Winter 1994-5
 "A life in writing", interview by Nicholas Wroe, The Guardian (17 October 2009)
 "The Books Interview: Craig Raine" The New Statesman 5 July 2010
 'Heartache in his Head', review of How Snow Falls in The Oxonian Review

English opera librettists
Alumni of Exeter College, Oxford
Fellows of New College, Oxford
Fellows of the Royal Society of Literature
1944 births
Living people
People educated at Barnard Castle School
People from Shildon
English male poets
English male dramatists and playwrights
Pasternak family